The Racquet Club of Chicago is a private social club and athletic club within the Gold Coast Historic District.  The classical revival building was designed by architect Andrew Rebori, constructed in 1923. It is a contributing structure within the National Register Gold Coast Historic District.

The Racquet Club currently features squash courts (two North American doubles and one International singles), two racquets courts, and one real tennis court restored in 2012. The racquets courts are the world's westernmost active venue for that sport.

The Racquet Club has been renovated, and where there once were two Squash singles courts, of the "American" style dimensions, there now is one court of the "International" dimensions.

See also
 List of American gentlemen's clubs

References

1923 establishments in Illinois
Clubs and societies in the United States
Racquets venues
Real tennis venues
Sports venues in Chicago
Squash venues
Tennis venues in Chicago
Gentlemen's clubs in the United States
Historic district contributing properties in Illinois
Clubhouses on the National Register of Historic Places in Illinois
National Register of Historic Places in Chicago
Sports venues on the National Register of Historic Places in Illinois
Tennis clubs

External links